Brachypelus is a genus of beetles in the family Carabidae, containing the following species:

 Brachypelus ambondrombe Bulirsch, Janak & Moravec, 2005
 Brachypelus basilewskyi Bulirsch, Janak & Moravec, 2005
 Brachypelus betsileo Bulirsch, Janak & Moravec, 2005
 Brachypelus fisheri Bulirsch, Janak & Moravec, 2005
 Brachypelus janaki Bulirsch & Moravec, 2009
 Brachypelus microphthalmus Basilewsky, 1980
 Brachypelus minor Alluaud, 1935
 Brachypelus newtoni Bulirsch, Janak & Moravec, 2005
 Brachypelus obesus Putzeys, 1866
 Brachypelus pauliani Basilewsky, 1980
 Brachypelus reticulatus Basilewsky, 1980
 Brachypelus rolandi Bulirsch, Janak & Moravec, 2005
 Brachypelus vohidray Bulirsch, Janak & Moravec, 2005
 Brachypelus vonickai Bulirsch, Janak & Moravec, 2005

References

Scaritinae